Ian J. Cartwright (13 November 1964 – 7 December 2016) was an English footballer, who played in the Football League for Wolverhampton Wanderers.

Career
Ian Cartwright signed for First Division Wolverhampton Wanderers as a youth trainee in 1980. He had to wait until his 18th birthday to make his first team debut, coming on as a substitute in a 1–4 defeat at Oldham Athletic. He made 9 appearances during the remainder of that season (scoring once) as the club won promotion back to the top flight at the first attempt.

He made 16 appearances during their doomed campaign of 1983/84 which saw them relegated from the First Division, beginning a slide down the divisions amid financial problems. Cartwright remained at the club until 1986 when released by manager Sammy Chapman, leaving him to play out his career in the non-league.

He died from renal and spinal cancer on 7 December 2016.

References

1964 births
2016 deaths
Footballers from Birmingham, West Midlands
English footballers
English Football League players
Wolverhampton Wanderers F.C. players
Deaths from kidney cancer
Deaths from spinal cancer
Association football midfielders
Deaths from cancer in England
Neurological disease deaths in England